The 1946 Miami Redskins football team was an American football team that represented Miami University as an independent during the 1946 college football season. In its third season under head coach Sid Gillman, Miami compiled a 7–3 record and outscored all opponents by a combined total of 220 to 72.  Paul Dietzel was the team captain.

Ara Parseghian played at the halfback position for the team. He was selected by the Pittsburgh Steelers in the 13th round (109th overall pick) of the 1947 NFL Draft.  He was inducted into the College Football Hall of Fame in 1980.

Mel Olix set a school record with 28 touchdown passes in 1946. The record stood for nearly 50 years.

Schedule

References

Miami
Miami RedHawks football seasons
Miami Redskins football